Elfriede Jelinek (born 20 October 1946) is an Austrian playwright and novelist. She is one of the most decorated authors writing in German today and was awarded the 2004 Nobel Prize in Literature for her "musical flow of voices and counter-voices in novels and plays that, with extraordinary linguistic zeal, reveal the absurdity of society's clichés and their subjugating power".
Next to Peter Handke and Botho Strauss she is considered to be the most important living playwright of the German language.

Biography 
Elfriede Jelinek was born on 20 October 1946 in Mürzzuschlag, Styria, the daughter of Olga Ilona (née Buchner), a personnel director, and Friedrich Jelinek. She was raised in Vienna by her Romanian-German Catholic mother and a non-observant Czech Jewish father (whose surname "Jelinek" means "little deer" in Czech). Her mother came from a bourgeois background, while her father was a working-class socialist.

Her father was a chemist, who managed to avoid persecution during the Second World War by working in strategically important industrial production. However, many of his relatives became victims of the Holocaust. Her mother, with whom she had a strained relationship, was from a formerly prosperous Vienna family. As a child, Elfriede attended a Roman Catholic convent school in Vienna. Her mother planned a career for her as a musical "Wunderkind". She was instructed in piano, organ, guitar, violin, viola, and recorder from an early age. Later, she went on to study at the Vienna Conservatory, where she graduated with an organist diploma; during this time, she tried to meet her mother's high expectations, while coping with her psychologically ill father. She studied art history and theater at the University of Vienna. However, she had to discontinue her studies due to an anxiety disorder, which resulted in self-isolation at her parents' house for a year. During this time, she began serious literary work as a form of therapy. After a year, she began to feel comfortable leaving the house, often with her mother. She began writing poetry at a young age. She made her literary debut with Lisas Schatten (Lisa's Shadow) in 1967, and received her first literary prize in 1969. During the 1960s, she became active politically, read a great deal, and "spent an enormous amount of time watching television".

She married Gottfried Hüngsberg on 12 June 1974.

Work and political engagement 
Despite the author's own differentiation from Austria (due to her criticism of Austria's Nazi past), Jelinek's writing is deeply rooted in the tradition of Austrian literature, showing the influence of Austrian writers such as Ingeborg Bachmann, Marlen Haushofer, and Robert Musil.

Jelinek's political positions, in particular her feminist stance and her Communist Party affiliations, are of vital importance to any assessment of her work. They are also a part of the reason for the controversy directed at Jelinek and her work. Editor Friederike Eigler states that Jelinek has three major and inter-related "targets" in her writing: what she views as capitalist consumer society and its commodification of all human beings and relationships, what she views as the remnants of Austria's fascist past in public and private life, and what she views as the systematic exploitation and oppression of women in a capitalist-patriarchal society. Jelinek has claimed in multiple interviews that the Austrian-Jewish satirical tradition has been a formative influence on her writing, citing Karl Kraus, Elias Canetti, and Jewish cabaret in particular. In an interview with Sigrid Löffler, Jelinek claimed that her work is considered an oddity in contemporary Austria, where she claims satire is unappreciated and misunderstood, "because the Jews are dead." She has stressed her Jewish identity as the daughter of a Holocaust survivor, claiming a continuity with a Jewish-Viennese tradition that she believes has been destroyed by fascism and is dying out.

Work 
Jelinek's output has included radio plays, poetry, theatre texts, polemical essays, anthologies, novels, translations, screenplays, musical compositions, libretti and ballets, film and video art.
Jelinek's work is multi-faceted, and highly controversial. It has been praised and condemned by leading literary critics. In the wake of the Fritzl case, for example, she was accused of "executing 'hysterical' portraits of Austrian perversity". Likewise, her political activism has encountered divergent and often heated reactions. Despite the controversy surrounding her work, Jelinek has won many distinguished awards; among them are the Georg Büchner Prize in 1998; the Mülheim Dramatists Prize in 2002 and 2004; the Franz Kafka Prize in 2004; and the Nobel Prize in Literature, also in 2004.

Female sexuality, sexual abuse, and the battle of the sexes in general are prominent topics in her work. Texts such as Wir sind Lockvögel, Baby! (We are Decoys, Baby!), Die Liebhaberinnen (Women as Lovers) and Die Klavierspielerin (The Piano Teacher) showcase the brutality and power play inherent in human relations in a style that is, at times, ironically formal and tightly controlled. According to Jelinek, power and aggression are often the principal driving forces of relationships. Likewise Ein Sportstück (Sports Play) explores the darker side of competitive sports. Her provocative novel Lust contains graphic description of sexuality, aggression and abuse. It received poor reviews by many critics, some of whom likened it to pornography. But others, who noted the power of the cold descriptions of moral failures, considered it to have been misunderstood and undervalued by them.

Her novel The Piano Teacher was the basis for the 2001 film of the same title by Austrian director Michael Haneke, starring Isabelle Huppert as the protagonist. In April 2006, Jelinek spoke out to support Peter Handke, whose play Die Kunst des Fragens (The Art of Asking) was removed from the repertoire of the Comédie-Française for his alleged support of Slobodan Milošević. Her work is less known in English-speaking countries. However, in July and August 2012, a major English language premiere of her play Ein Sportstück by Just a Must theatre company brought her dramatic work to the attention of English-speaking audiences. The following year, in February and March 2013, the Women's Project in New York staged the North American premiere of Jackie, one of her Princess Dramas.

Political engagement 
Jelinek was a member of Austria's Communist Party from 1974 to 1991. She became a household name during the 1990s due to her vociferous clash with Jörg Haider's Freedom Party. Following the 1999 National Council elections, and the subsequent formation of a coalition cabinet consisting of the Freedom Party and the Austrian People's Party, Jelinek became one of the new cabinet's more vocal critics.

Many foreign governments moved swiftly to ostracize Austria's administration, citing the Freedom Party's alleged nationalism and authoritarianism. The cabinet construed the sanctions against it as directed against Austria as such, and attempted to prod the nation into a national rallying (Nationaler Schulterschluss) behind the coalition parties.

This provoked a temporary heating of the political climate severe enough for dissidents such as Jelinek to be accused of treason by coalition supporters.

In the mid- to late-1980s, Jelinek was one of many Austrian intellectuals who signed a petition for the release of Jack Unterweger, who was imprisoned for the murder of a prostitute, and who was regarded by intellectuals and politicians as an example of successful rehabilitation. Unterweger was later found guilty of murdering nine more women within two years of his release, and committed suicide after his arrest.

Awards and honors 
 1996: Literaturpreis der Stadt Bremen for Die Kinder der Toten
 1998: Georg Büchner Prize
 2002: Mülheimer Dramatikerpreis for Macht Nichts
 2003: Else Lasker-Schüler Dramatist Prize
 2004: Hörspielpreis der Kriegsblinden for Jackie
 2004: Franz Kafka Prize
 2004: Nobel Prize in Literature
 2004: Stig Dagerman Prize
 2004: Mülheimer Dramatikerpreis for Das Werk
 2009: Mülheimer Dramatikerpreis for Rechnitz (Der Würgeengel)
 2011: Mülheimer Dramatikerpreis for Winterreise
 2011 Honorary member of the American Academy of Arts and Letters
 2017 Theatre prize Der Faust for lifetime achievement
 2021 Honorary citizen of the City of Vienna
 2021 Nestroy Theatre Prize for lifetime achievement

Publications

Poetry 
 Lisas Schatten; München 1967
 ende: gedichte von 1966–1968; München 2000

Novels 
 bukolit.hörroman (written 1968, published by Rhombus Verlag, 1979). bukolit: audio novel.
 wir sind lockvögel baby! (Rowohlt, 1970).
 Michael. Ein Jugendbuch für die Infantilgesellschaft (Rowohlt, 1972).
 Die Liebhaberinnen (Rowohlt, 1975). Women as Lovers, trans. Martin Chalmers (London: Serpent's Tail, 1994). .
 Die Ausgesperrten (Rowohlt, 1980). Wonderful, Wonderful Times, trans. Michael Hulse (London: Serpent's Tail, 1990). .
 Die Klavierspielerin (Rowohlt, 1983). The Piano Teacher, trans. Joachim Neugroschel (New York: Weidenfeld & Nicolson, 1988). .
 Oh Wildnis, oh Schutz vor ihr (Rowohlt, 1985).
 Lust (Rowohlt, 1989). Lust, trans. Michael Hulse (London: Serpent's Tail, 1992). .
 Die Kinder der Toten (Rowohlt, 1995). The Children of the Dead.
 Gier (Rowohlt, 2000). Greed, trans. Martin Chalmers (London: Serpent's Tail, 2006). .
 Neid (2007). Envy. Private novel published on Jelinek's website.
 rein GOLD. ein bühnenessay (Rowohlt, 2013). rein GOLD, trans. Gitta Honegger (Fitzcarraldo Editions, 2021).

Plays 
 Was geschah, nachdem Nora ihren Mann verlassen hatte; oder Stützen der Gesellschaften (1979). What Happened after Nora Left Her Husband; or Pillars of Society. Premiered at Graz, October 1979.
 Clara S, musikalische Tragödie (1982). Clara S, a Musical Tragedy. Premiered at Bonn, 1982.
 Krankheit oder Moderne Frauen. Wie ein Stück (1984). Illness or Modern Women. Like a Play. Premiered at Bonn, 1987.
Burgtheater. Posse mit Gesang (1985). Burgtheater. Farce with Songs. Premiered at Bonn, 1985.
 Begierde und Fahrererlaubnis (eine Pornographie) (1986). Desire and Permission to Drive – Pornography. Premiered at the Styrian Autumn, Graz, 1986.
 Wolken. Heim (1988). Clouds. Home. Premiered at Bonn, 1988.
Präsident Abendwind. Ein Dramolett, sehr frei nach Johann Nestroy (1992). President Abendwind. A dramolet, very freely after Johann Nestroy. Premiered at Tyrol Landestheater, Innsbruck, 1992.
 Totenauberg (1992). Premiered at Burgtheater (Akademietheater), 1992.
 Raststätte oder Sie machens alle. Eine Komödie (1994). Service Area or They're All Doing It. A Comedy. Premiered at Burgtheater, 1994.
 Stecken, Stab und Stangl. Eine Handarbeit (1996). Rod, Staff, and Crook – Handmade. Premiered at Deutsches Schauspielhaus, 1996.
 Ein Sportstück (1998). Sports Play, trans. Penny Black (Oberon Books, 2012). Premiered at Burgtheater, 1998; English-language premiere in Lancaster, 11 July 2012. Also translated by Lillian Banks as Sports Chorus for the Museum of Contemporary Art in Krakow.
 er nicht als er (zu, mit Robert Walser) (1998). Her Not All Her: On/With Robert Walser, trans. Damion Searls (Sylph Editions, 2012). Premiered at Salzburg Festival in conjunction with Deutsches Schauspielhaus, 1998.
 Das Lebewohl (2000). Les Adieux. Premiered at Berliner Ensemble, 2000.
 Das Schweigen (2000). Silence. Premiered at Deutsches Schauspielhaus, 2000.
 Der Tod und das Mädchen II (2000). Death and the Maiden II. Premiered at Expo 2000 in conjunction with the Saarbrücken Staatstheater and ZKM Karlsruhe.
 MACHT NICHTS – Eine Kleine Trilogie des Todes (2001). NO PROBLEM – A Little Trilogy of Death. Premiered at Schauspielhaus Zürich, 2001.
 In den Alpen (2002). In the Alps. Premiered at Munich Kammerspiele in conjunction with Schauspielhaus Zürich, 2002.
 Prinzessinnendramen: Der Tod und das Mädchen I-III und IV-V (2002). Princess Dramas: Death and the Maiden I-III and IV-V. Parts I-III premiered at Deutsches Schauspielhaus, 2002; Parts IV-V premiered at Deutsches Theater, 2002.
 Das Werk (2003). Premiered at Burgtheater (Akademietheater), 2003.
 Bambiland (2003). Trans. Lilian Friedberg (2007). Premiered at Burgtheater, 2003.
 Irm und Margit A part of "Attabambi Pornoland" (2004). Premiered at Schauspielhaus Zürich, 2004.
 Ulrike Maria Stuart (2006). Premiered at Thalia Theater, 2006.
 Über Tiere (2006).
 Rechnitz (Der Würgeengel) (2008). Rechnitz (The Exterminating Angel).
 Die Kontrakte des Kaufmanns. Eine Wirtschaftskomödie (2009). The Merchant's Contracts.
 Das Werk / Im Bus / Ein Sturz (2010). Premiered at Schauspiel Köln, 2010.
 Winterreise (2011). Premiered at Munich Kammerspiele, 2011.
 Kein Licht (2011). Premiered at Schauspiel Köln, 2011
 FaustIn and out (2011). Premiered at Schauspielhaus Zürich, 2012.
 Die Straße. Die Stadt. Der Überfall (2012). Premiered at Munich Kammerspiele, 2012.
 Schatten (Eurydike sagt) (2013). Shadow. Eurydice Says, trans. Gitta Honegger (2017). Premiered at Burgtheater, 2013.
 Aber sicher! (2013). Premiered at Theater Bremen, 2013.
 Die Schutzbefohlenen (2013). Charges (The Supplicants), trans. Gitta Honegger (Seagull Books, 2016). First read at Hamburg, 2013; first produced at Mannheim, 23 May 2014.
Das schweigende Mädchen (2014). Premiered at Munich, 27 September 2014.
Wut (2016). Fury, trans. Gitta Honegger (Seagull Books, 2022). Premiered at Munich, 16 April 2016.
Am Königsweg (2017). On the Royal Road: The Burgher King, trans. Gitta Honegger (Seagull Books, 2020). Premiered at Hamburg, 28 October 2017.
Schnee Weiss (2018). Premiered at Cologne, 21 December 2018.
Schwarzwasser (2020). Premiered at Vienna, 6 February 2020.

Opera libretto 
 Lost Highway (2003), adapted from the film by David Lynch, with music by Olga Neuwirth

Translations 
 Die Enden der Parabel (Gravity's Rainbow) novel by Thomas Pynchon; 1976
 Herrenjagd drama by Georges Feydeau; 1983
 Floh im Ohr drama by Georges Feydeau; 1986
 Der Gockel drama by Georges Feydeau; 1986
 Die Affaire Rue de Lourcine drama by Eugène Labiche; 1988
 Die Dame vom Maxim drama by Georges Feydeau; 1990
 Der Jude von Malta drama by Christopher Marlowe; 2001
 Ernst sein ist alles drama by Oscar Wilde; 2004
 Der ideale Mann drama by Oscar Wilde; 2011
 Poetry and short stories from Latin American authors

Jelinek's works in English translation 
The Piano Teacher, trans. Joachim Neugroschel (New York: Weidenfeld & Nicolson, 1988). .
Wonderful, Wonderful Times, trans. Michael Hulse (London: Serpent's Tail, 1990). .
 Lust, trans. Michael Hulse (London: Serpent's Tail, 1992). .
 Women as Lovers, trans. Martin Chalmers (London: Serpent's Tail, 1994). .
 Greed, trans. Martin Chalmers (London: Serpent's Tail, 2006). .
 Bambiland, trans. Lilian Friedberg (2009), in Theater 39.3, pp. 111–43.
Her Not All Her: On/With Robert Walser, trans. Damion Searls (Sylph Editions, 2012).
Sports Play, trans. Penny Black (Oberon Books, 2012).
Sports Chorus, trans. Lilian Banks (2012), in Sport in Art, commissioned by Museum of Contemporary Art in Kraków.
 Rechnitz and The Merchant's Contracts, trans. Gitta Honegger (Seagull Books, 2015). .
 Charges (The Supplicants), trans. Gitta Honegger (Seagull Books, 2016). . 
Three Plays: Rechnitz, The Merchant's Contracts, Charges (The Supplicants), trans. Gitta Honegger (Seagull Books, 2019).
On the Royal Road: The Burgher King, trans. Gitta Honegger (Seagull Books, 2020).
rein GOLD, trans. Gitta Honegger (Fitzcarraldo Editions, 2021).
Fury, trans. Gitta Honegger (Seagull Books, 2022).

See also 
 List of female Nobel laureates
 Gottfried Hüngsberg (German Wikipedia)

References

Further reading 
 Bethman, Brenda. 'Obscene Fantasies': Elfriede Jelinek's Generic Perversions. New York, NY: Peter Lang, 2011; 
 Fiddler, Allyson. Rewriting Reality: An Introduction to Elfriede Jelinek. Oxford: Berg, 1994; 
 Gérard Thiériot (dir.). Elfriede Jelinek et le devenir du drame, Toulouse, Presses universitaires du Mirail, 2006; 
 Flitner, Bettina. Frauen mit Visionen – 48 Europäerinnen (Women with Visions – 48 Europeans). With texts by Alice Schwarzer.
 Konzett, Matthias. The Rhetoric of National Dissent in Thomas Bernhard, Peter Handke, and Elfriede Jelinek. Rochester, NY: Camden House, 2000; 
 Lamb-Faffelberger, Margarete and Matthias Konzett, editors. Elfriede Jelinek: Writing Woman, Nation, and Identity--A Critical Anthology. Fairleigh Dickinson University Press, 2007; 
 Rosellini, Jay. "Haider, Jelinek, and the Austrian Culture Wars". CreateSpace.com, 2009. .

External links 

  
 Elfriede Jelinek-Forschungszentrum
  including the Nobel Lecture on 7 December 2004 Sidelined
 BBC synopsis
List of works
 Elfriede Jelinek: Nichts ist verwirklicht. Alles muss jetzt neu definiert werden.  
 The Goethe-Institut's 70th Birthday Page for Elfriede Jelinek 
 Some of Jelinek's poems in English from the Poetry Foundation
Sound recordings with Elfriede Jelinek in the Online Archive of the Österreichische Mediathek (Literary readings, interviews and radio reports) 

1946 births
21st-century Austrian Jews
Living people
Nobel laureates in Literature
Austrian Nobel laureates
Jewish Austrian writers
Jewish feminists
Jewish dramatists and playwrights
Jewish novelists
Jewish socialists
Jewish women writers
Austrian women dramatists and playwrights
Austrian communists
Austrian feminists
Austrian women novelists
Austrian people of Czech-Jewish descent
Austrian people of German descent
Austrian people of Romanian descent
BDSM writers
Communist Party of Austria politicians
Georg Büchner Prize winners
People from Mürzzuschlag
Women Nobel laureates
20th-century Austrian women writers
21st-century Austrian women writers
20th-century Austrian dramatists and playwrights
21st-century Austrian dramatists and playwrights
20th-century Austrian novelists
21st-century Austrian novelists
Austrian socialist feminists
Communist women writers
German-language poets